Harry Jack Darling (born 8 August 1999) is an English professional footballer who plays as a defender for EFL Championship club Swansea City.

Club career

Cambridge United 
Darling joined Cambridge United at the age of 12, but left a year later. After being spotted again playing for Newmarket Town's youth team, he rejoined the club in 2015. Darling joined the first team for pre-season ahead of the 2016–17 campaign. On 8 November 2016, he made his debut in a 2–0 EFL Trophy defeat to Scunthorpe United.

He signed his first professional contract with the club in October 2016. On 8 August 2017, Darling started in a 4–1 EFL Cup defeat at Bristol Rovers. He made his full league debut for the club on 13 January 2018 in a 0–0 draw against Mansfield Town. On 17 August 2019, he scored his first professional goal, an 86th-minute winner against Colchester United.

Milton Keynes Dons
On 22 January 2021, Darling joined EFL League One club Milton Keynes Dons for an undisclosed fee, and made his debut four days later in a 0–1 home defeat to Charlton Athletic. Despite only being with the club since the January transfer window, he was named MK Dons' Young Player of the Year for the 2020–21 season after just 21 appearances.

On 31 August 2021, whilst captaining the side, Darling scored his first goal for the club, on his 100th start as a professional, in a 2–1 EFL Trophy group stage win away over Burton Albion. He scored his first league goal on 27 November 2021, in a 4–0 away win over Morecambe. 

After an impressive first full season at the club in which he scored 10 goals in all competitions from centre-back, Darling was named in both the EFL League One Team of the Season and PFA Team of the Year for 2021–22 alongside teammate Scott Twine.

Swansea City
On 18 June 2022, Darling signed for EFL Championship club Swansea City on a three-year deal for an undisclosed fee, reuniting with former coach Russell Martin.

Career statistics

Honours
Cambridge United
EFL League Two runners-up: 2020–21

Individual
Milton Keynes Dons Young Player of the Year: 2020–21
EFL League One Team of the Season: 2021–22
Milton Keynes Dons Players' Player of the Year: 2021–22
PFA Team of the Year: 2021–22 League One

References

External links 
 

English footballers
1999 births
Living people
Footballers from Cambridgeshire
Sportspeople from Cambridge
Association football defenders
Cambridge United F.C. players
Newmarket Town F.C. players
Bishop's Stortford F.C. players
Hampton & Richmond Borough F.C. players
Royston Town F.C. players
East Thurrock United F.C. players
Milton Keynes Dons F.C. players
Swansea City A.F.C. players
English Football League players
Southern Football League players
Isthmian League players
National League (English football) players